Ultimate Comics: Doomsday is a metaseries collection of three 4-issue comic book limited series published by Marvel Comics. All three series (Ultimate Enemy, Ultimate Mystery and Ultimate Doom) are set in the Ultimate Marvel universe, and are written by Brian Michael Bendis with art by Rafa Sandoval.

Publication history
Bendis has discussed the idea behind the stories and the problems it brings:

Plot summary
The series mainly focuses on what remains of the Fantastic Four after Ultimatum, specifically dealing with an unknown threat (revealed later) trying to alter the entire Ultimate Universe, in the process causing a significant amount of destruction. Whilst the previous members of the Fantastic Four remain prominent throughout the series, many other characters from different strands of the Ultimate universe also feature.

Collected editions
The entire series has been collected into the following hardcover volume:

See also
 Ultimate Fantastic Four
 Ultimate Requiem
 Ultimate Comics: Spider-Man

References

External links

Newsarama's interview with Brian Bendis
Comic Book Resources Ultimate Comics Doom review